This is a list of airports in Switzerland, sorted by location.


Airports 

Airport names shown in bold have scheduled passenger service on commercial airlines.

See also 
 List of the busiest airports in Switzerland
 Swiss Air Force
 Transport in Switzerland
 List of airports by ICAO code: L#LS – Switzerland
 Wikipedia: WikiProject Aviation/Airline destination lists: Europe#Switzerland

References 
 Link broken 
 Link broken  - includes IATA codes
 Link broken World Aero Data: Airports in Switzerland - ICAO codes and airport data
 Great Circle Mapper: Airports in Switzerland - IATA and ICAO codes

External links 

FallingRain.com: Airports in Switzerland
Aircraft Charter World: Airports in Switzerland
The Airport Guide: Airports in Switzerland

Switzerland
 
Airports
Switzerland
Airports